Lepidoblepharis duolepis is a species of gecko, a lizard in the family Sphaerodactylidae. The species is endemic to Colombia.

Geographic range
L. duolepis is found in Antioquia Department and Valle del Cauca Department, Colombia.

Reproduction
L. duolepis is oviparous.

References

Further reading
Ayala, Stephen C.; Castro, Fernando (1983). "Dos nuevos geckos (Sauria: Gekkonidae, Sphaerodactylinae) para Colombia: Lepidoblepharis xanthostigma (Noble) y descripcion de una nueva especie ". Caldasia 13 (65): 743–753. (Lepidoblepharis duolepis, new species, pp. 749–752, Figure 5). (in Spanish, with an abstract in English).
Valencia-Zuleta A, Jaramillo-Martínez AF, Echeverry-Bocanegra A, Viáfra-Vega R, Hernández-Córdoba O, Cardona-Botero VE, Gutiérrez-Zúñiga J, Castro-Herrera F (2014). "Conservation status of the herpetofauna, protected areas, and current problems in Valle del Cauca, Colombia". Amphibian & Reptile Conservation 8 (2): 1–18.

Lepidoblepharis
Reptiles described in 1983
Reptiles of Colombia
Endemic fauna of Colombia